Carinodrillia fusiformis is an extinct species of sea snail, a marine gastropod mollusk in the family Pseudomelatomidae, the turrids and allies.

Distribution
This extinct species was found in Miocene to Pliocene strata of the Dominican Republic and in Oligocene to Miocene strata of Haiti; age range: 33.9 to 3.6 Ma

References

 Gabb, William M. On the topography and geology of Santo Domingo. M'Calla & Stavely, printers, 1873.

External links
 Worldwide Mollusc Species Data Base : Carinodrillia fusiformis

fusiformis
Gastropods described in 1873